"The lamps are going out all over Europe, we shall not see them lit again in our life-time", British Foreign Secretary Sir Edward Grey remarked to a friend on the eve of the United Kingdom's entry into the First World War. First published in Grey's memoirs in 1925, the statement earned wide attention as an accurate perception of the First World War and its geopolitical and cultural consequences.

Original sources

Grey's memoirs Twenty-Five Years 1892–1916 mention the remark as being made on 3 August 1914: 

In 1927, John Alfred Spender, editor of the Westminster Gazette until 1922, identified himself as the friend to whom Grey had spoken:

Later allusions
Grey's quotation has been used as a summation of the war in numerous historical works. The German author Ludwig Reiners (1896–1957) published an account of World War I entitled The lamps went out in Europe. Therein Grey's comment is followed by the assertion attributed to Otto von Bismarck: "The mistakes that have been committed in foreign policy are not, as a rule, apparent to the public until a generation afterwards." Samuel Hynes began his 1990 A War Imagined with a paragraph covering the quotation, referring to it as the best-known and most often quoted response to the beginning of the war. In 2014 Grey's words were the inspiration for part of the British commemoration of the centenary of the outbreak of the First World War. Between 10 and 11 pm on 4 August 2014, lights were dimmed at many public locations and in private homes, including progressively at a national memorial service in Westminster Abbey.

On 16 October 1938, Winston Churchill broadcast a speech known as "The Defence of Freedom and Peace (The Lights are Going Out)" to London and the United States.  In the speech he says, "The stations of uncensored expression are closing down; the lights are going out; but there is still time for those to whom freedom and parliamentary government mean something, to consult together."

Notes

External links
 Foreign News: The Lights Go On from TIME Magazine

Political quotes
Quotations from military
British political phrases
English phrases
United Kingdom in World War I
1910s neologisms